The Adding Machine is a 1923 play by Elmer Rice; it has been called "... a landmark of American Expressionism, reflecting the growing interest in this highly subjective and nonrealistic form of modern drama."

Plot
The author of this play takes us through Mr. Zero’s trial, execution, excursion, and arrest going into the afterlife. During the whole series of this episodic journey, Mr. Zero is surprisingly oblivious to his deepest needs, wants, and desires. The story focuses on Mr. Zero, an accountant at a large, faceless company.  After 25 years at his job, he discovers that he will be replaced by an adding machine.  In anger and pain, he snaps and kills his boss. Mr. Zero is then tried for murder, found guilty, and hanged.  He wakes up in a heaven-like setting known as the "Elysian Fields." Mr. Zero meets a man named Shrdlu, then begins to operate an adding machine until Lieutenant Charles, the boss of the Elysian Fields, comes to tell Zero that he is a waste of space and his soul is going to be sent back to Earth to be reused. The play ends with Zero following a very attractive girl named Hope off-stage.

Success
The play was an influence on the Tennessee Williams play Stairs to the Roof. Years later, it was adapted into a 1969 film of the same name, written and directed by Jerome Epstein and starring Milo O'Shea, Phyllis Diller, Billie Whitelaw and Sydney Chaplin.

In 1989, Chicago's Hystopolis Productions adapted Rice's play for puppets; the production was hailed for its visual design. In September 1992 this production went on to be featured at the First International Festival of Puppet Theater presented at The Public Theater in New York which was a co-production of Joseph Papp and the Jim Henson Foundation. The Adding Machine remains part of Hystopolis' professional repertoire.

Musical adaptation

In 2007, the play was adapted into a musical entitled Adding Machine with a score by Joshua Schmidt and a book by Jason Loewith and Schmidt.  The musical debuted in Illinois at the Next Theatre Company in 2007.  It then opened Off-Broadway at the Minetta Lane Theatre on February 25, 2008, after previews that started on February 8. In September 2016 the musical was produced at the Finborough Theatre in London England.

References

Further reading

External links

1923 plays
Plays by Elmer Rice
Broadway plays
Expressionist plays